is a train station of JR Kyushu Nichinan Line in Shibushi, Kagoshima, Japan.

Lines 
Kyushu Railway Company
Nichinan Line

JR

Adjacent stations

Gallery 

Railway stations in Japan opened in 1935
Railway stations in Kagoshima Prefecture